Xhemail Abria (1830–1908) was a Kosovar wise old man and intellectual born in Abria village, Drenica region, Kosovo.

Background
He was the son of Sefer Kuçi. Educated at home as a youth, he worked as a shepherd. Though self-taught, he was precocious and participated in the popular education of the time.

Career
He was awarded the title Pleqnar i Kosovës ("Elder of Kosovo") at the Junik Assembly of 1877 and raised his profile by attending the inaugural meeting of the League of Prizren in 1878. He represented Drenica at the subsequent meeting, presided over by Binak Alia, where the Karanarme decree was signed. Alia later passed the chairmanship on to Abria. In addition, he participated in the 1899 Assembly of Peć (held near what is now Deçan) and Deli Prekazi's Drenica revolt in 1903.

The People's Genius
Xhemail Abria was known by three surnames: Abria (from his birthplace, known in Albanian as Abria e Epërme), the honorific Aga, and Seferi (from his father). Rising from illiteracy to a connoisseur's understanding of the philosophy, history, and geography of the Albanian people, he was given the sobriquet of Gjeniu i Popullit ("The People’s Genius").

An apocryphal example was his response to a query from a village elder named Rexhë Hyseni from Belo Polje, near what is now Istok. The man asked Abria to solve a thorny dispute between two local clans over a family gravesite too old to otherwise identify. Abria suggested the following, akin to a crude version of modern DNA analysis:

Exhume one of the dead and get a bone from therein. Summon one man from each family and obtain a drop of blood from each. Put each drop on the bone and see which one is absorbed into the marrow, awarding the site to that drop’s bloodline.

Quotes
  (“Words have no weight standing (so sit)!”)
  (“I drank cold coffee!”)
  (“I can’t stand women, I see them!”)
  (“Do not overdo anything, for good or for ill!”)
  (“The man’s manhood is three floors high!”)
  (“Someone can die without being buried!”)
  (“There is no boundary between his mind and another’s!”)
  (“There is nothing like the words of elders and the weapons of the brave!”)
  (“It is hard to make an enemy a friend, while a friend can be made an enemy anytime you like!”)
  (“Two branches come out of a stump!”)
  (“With your enemy, you must measure the effect of your words!”)
  (“You shouldn’t laugh all three of the following: a bad brother, a bad wife, and bad neighbors”)
  (“There are four things nobody can hide from me: wisdom and foolishness, wealth and poverty!”)
  (“Said to an imam: speak more often, knowledge without wisdom is like a lamp without oil, it may burn briefly but extinguishes once purchased!”)

Bibliography
 Bajrami, Xhemail (2010). Xhemail Abria – Pleqnar i Kosovës. Pristina: Koha.
 Çeta, Anton (1990). Prozë popullore nga Drenica, vol. II. Pristina: Enti i teksteve dhe i mjeteve mësimore i Krahinës Socialiste Autonome të Kosovës.
 Greiçevci, Riza (2012). Kështu ka thanë Xhemail Abria. Pristina, 2012.
 Kadishani, Jetish (1988). Fjalë të urta dhe shprehje popullore. Klina: Klubi letrar "Jehona e Dukagjinit."
 Nushi, Pajazit (1984). "Mendimi i pleqnarve dhe struktura e tij." Gjurmime albanologjike: folklor dhe etnologji. Pristina: Albanological Institute of Pristina.
 Rukiqi, Mehmet (1998). Krijues dhe bartës të tregimeve popullore në Drenicë. Pristina: Albanological Institute of Pristina.

References

1830 births
1908 deaths
People from Drenas